The list of New Testament Minuscules ordered by Gregory-Aland index number is divided into three sections:
 List of New Testament minuscules (1–1000)
 List of New Testament minuscules (1001–2000)
 List of New Testament minuscules (2001–3000)

By location and institution 
List of New Testament Minuscules ordered by location and hosting institution:

(*) Indicates only a portion of manuscript held by institution.
(**) Indicates manuscript is a forgery.
Bold Indicates manuscript has been color photographed.

A–F

G

H–M

N–T

U–Z

See also 

List of artifacts significant to the Bible
List of New Testament Church Fathers
List of New Testament Latin manuscripts
List of New Testament lectionaries
List of New Testament amulets
List of New Testament papyri
List of New Testament uncials

References

Bibliography 
 
 
 

 
Miniscules